The 2015 Ecuador Open Quito was an ATP tennis tournament played on outdoor clay courts. It was the 1st edition of the Ecuador Open as part of the ATP World Tour 250 series of the 2015 ATP World Tour. It took place in Quito, Ecuador from February 2 through February 8, 2015.

Singles main-draw entrants

Seeds 

 Rankings were as of January 19, 2015.

Other entrants 
The following players received wildcards into the singles main draw:
  Gonzalo Escobar
  Márton Fucsovics
  Giovanni Lapentti

The following players received entry from the qualifying draw:
  André Ghem
  Nicolás Jarry
  Gerald Melzer
  Renzo Olivo

Withdrawals
Before the tournament
  Sam Groth → replaced by  Evgeny Donskoy
  Filip Krajinović → replaced by  Adrián Menéndez Maceiras
  Pere Riba → replaced by  Facundo Argüello
  Jimmy Wang → replaced by  Luca Vanni

Doubles main-draw entrants

Seeds 

 Rankings were as of January 19, 2015.

Other entrants 
The following pairs received wildcards into the doubles main draw:
  Nicolás Jarry /  Giovanni Lapentti
  Sergio Pérez-Pérez /  Fernando Verdasco

The following pair received entry as alternates:
  Gero Kretschmer /  Alexander Satschko

Withdrawals 
Before the tournament
  Facundo Argüello (stomach pain)

Champions

Singles 

  Víctor Estrella Burgos def.  Feliciano López, 6–2, 6–7(5–7), 7–6(7–5)

Doubles 

   Gero Kretschmer /  Alexander Satschko def.  Víctor Estrella Burgos /  João Souza,  7–5, 7–6(7–3)

References

External links 

Official website

Ecuador Open Quito
Ecuador Open (tennis)